Miocora is a genus of damselflies in the family Polythoridae. There are at least two described species in Miocora.

Species
These two species belong to the genus Miocora:
 Miocora pellucida Kennedy, 1940 i c g
 Miocora peraltica Calvert, 1917 i c g
Data sources: i = ITIS, c = Catalogue of Life, g = GBIF, b = Bugguide.net

References

Further reading

 
 
 
 
 
 
 

Damselflies